Milan Pavlović (Serbian Cyrillic: Милан Павловић, born 30 December 1967) is a Serbian retired footballer, who played as a defender.

Club career
Pavlović began playing football with FK Željezničar Sarajevo in the Yugoslav First League.

Pavlović moved to Greece in July 1992, initially joining third tier side Visaltiakos Nigrita before spending two years with Anagennisi Karditsa F.C. on the second tier. He would move up to play for Iraklis F.C. during the 1995–96 Alpha Ethniki season. After another season with Anagennisi Karditsa on the second tier, he moved to first-tier side Ethnikos Asteras F.C. for four seasons. In total, Pavlović made 132 appearances in the Greek top flight.

International career
Pavlović became world champion with Yugoslavia at the 1987 FIFA World Youth Championship in Chile. He was the national team captain at that World Cup.

Honours
Yugoslavia Youth 
FIFA World Youth Championship: 1987

References

External links
 Profile at Strukljeva.net

1967 births
Living people
Sportspeople from Šabac
Association football defenders
Yugoslav footballers
Serbian footballers
FK Željezničar Sarajevo players
Anagennisi Karditsa F.C. players
Iraklis Thessaloniki F.C. players
Ethnikos Asteras F.C. players
Yugoslav First League players
Super League Greece players
Football League (Greece) players
Serbian expatriate footballers
Expatriate footballers in Greece
Serbian expatriate sportspeople in Greece